Escape from New York is a 1981 post-apocalyptic action film directed by John Carpenter.

Escape from New York may also refer to:

 Escape from New York (game), a 1981 board game based on the film
 Escape from New York (soundtrack), the score of the film
 "Escape from New York" (Pretty Little Liars), an episode of the American TV series Pretty Little Liars
 Escape from New York (65daysofstatic album), a 2009 live album by post-rock band 65daysofstatic
 Escape from New York (Beast Coast album), a 2019 album by hip hop collective Beast Coast